Nacella terroris is a southern, cold-water species of sea snail, a limpet, a marine gastropod mollusc in the family Nacellidae, the true limpets.

References

 

Nacellidae
Gastropods of New Zealand
Gastropods described in 1880
Taxa named by Henri Filhol